David Stephen Thompson (born 27 May 1962) is an English former footballer who played as a midfielder.

Born in Manchester, Thompson started his professional career with Rochdale before joining Notts County in 1986.

Thompson joined Wigan Athletic in October 1987. During his three seasons at the club, he scored 16 goals in 108 League appearances, and was the club's Player of the Year for the 1988–89 season. In the 1989–90 League Cup, Thompson scored in the first leg of Wigan's second round tie against Liverpool, giving them a 2–1 lead at Anfield, although the team eventually went on to lose the match 2–5. In March 1990, he scored a hat trick in a 3–1 win against Shrewsbury Town.

In August 1990, Thompson was signed by Preston North End for a fee of £77,500. He went on to play for Chester City before finishing his career with a second spell at Rochdale.

References

External links
 

1962 births
Living people
Footballers from Manchester
English footballers
Association football midfielders
English Football League players
Rochdale A.F.C. players
Notts County F.C. players
Wigan Athletic F.C. players
Preston North End F.C. players
Chester City F.C. players